Reinickella is a genus of spiders in the family Thomisidae. It was first described in 1907 by Dahl. , it contains only one species, Reinickella xysticoides, found in Java.

References

Thomisidae
Monotypic Araneomorphae genera
Spiders of Asia